BB Doradus or BB Dor is a cataclysmic variable, a pre-nova star, thus a close pair binary star system. It is composed of a red dwarf and a white dwarf. Observations of the white dwarf's faint but certain accretion disk are consistent with it being at ~10° inclination (to the line of sight from the Earth).

Its parallax (movement against background stars due to the earth's orbit around the Sun) given by the Gaia space observatory's second data release puts the pair at about 3,000 light years away.

References

Cataclysmic variable stars
Dorado (constellation)
Doradus, BB